A Swiss Guatemalan is a Guatemalan of Swiss heritage, hailing from the waves of immigration that began in the 19th century. The Swiss often came simultaneously with expatriates from Belgium and Germany during the first period of immigration in the 1840s, with many arriving as chartered settlers.

History 
The history of the Swiss in Guatemala dates back to the 19th century, with the first wave of immigration culminating in the Swiss government opening a consulate in 1891. The majority of immigrants from this first wave originated from Geneva and settled primarily in Guatemala City, with some additional settlement in the surrounding highlands. Switzerland and Guatemala have sustained a committed trade partnership that began during this time period. Guatemala drew a second wave of European immigrants to the city of Quetzaltenango, many of them Swiss, following the construction of the Ferrocarril de los Altos (Railway of the high lands) and the establishment of the coffee plantation system in the early 20th century.

Culture 
On July 24, 2014, the Swiss Ambassador to Guatemala, Jürg Benz, and the Swiss embassy in Guatemala, celebrated 123 years of diplomatic relations have as much as trade between the two countries, mentioned above the country opened its consul since 1891. By the 19th century, the Swiss immigrants boosted the chocolate manufacture in Guatemala. Swiss immigrants have also left descendants in the nation, and living mostly in Guatemala City, in Quetzaltenango there are Native Indigenous Guatemalans with Swiss features due to a mixtures between Kakchiquel Native Guatemalans and Swiss immigrants.

Notable Swiss Guatemalans 
 Jacobo Árbenz
 Eduardo Suger
 Fritz García Gallont
 Carlos Lopez-Barillas

References

External links 
 Colegio Suizo Americano

Immigration to Guatemala
Guatemalan people of Swiss descent
European Guatemalan